Ryan Bast (born August 27, 1975) is a Canadian former professional ice hockey defenceman. Undrafted, he played two games in the National Hockey League with the Philadelphia Flyers during the 1998–99 season.

Bast concluded his 11-year professional career after his second year with the Alaska Aces of the ECHL in the 2004–05 season.

Career statistics

Awards and honours

References

External links
 

1975 births
Alaska Aces (ECHL) players
Calgary Hitmen players
Canadian ice hockey defencemen
Hartford Wolf Pack players
Ice hockey people from Saskatchewan
Las Vegas Thunder players
Living people
Lowell Lock Monsters players
Pee Dee Pride players
Philadelphia Flyers players
Philadelphia Phantoms players
Portland Winterhawks players
Prince Albert Raiders players
Saint John Flames players
Sportspeople from Regina, Saskatchewan
Swift Current Broncos players
Toledo Storm players